Geoff Goodland (born December 22, 1955, in Portage, Wisconsin, United States) is an American curler.

At the national level, he is a 2002 United States men's curling champion and two-time United States mixed curling champion (1991, 1993). Also he is a five-time United States senior curling champion (2007, 2011, 2016, 2017, 2019).

Awards
 2011 United States Curling Association Team of the Year (with teammates Tim Solin, Pete Westberg, Ken Olson, and Philip DeVore)

Teams

Men's

Mixed

References

External links

 

1955 births
Living people
Sportspeople from Wisconsin
People from Portage, Wisconsin
American male curlers
American curling champions
Continental Cup of Curling participants